Wang I-ting (born 21 November 1981) is a Taiwanese former professional tennis player.

Wang, who reached a career high singles world ranking of 438, was a playing member of the Chinese Taipei Fed Cup team between 2001 and 2004. She featured in a total of nine ties, winning one singles and four doubles rubbers.

ITF finals

Singles: 1 (0–1)

Doubles: 4 (1–3)

References

External links
 
 
 

1981 births
Living people
Taiwanese female tennis players
Tennis players at the 2002 Asian Games
Asian Games competitors for Chinese Taipei
21st-century Taiwanese women